Odette Jeanette Chantal Palma Lafourcade (born 7 August 1982, in Osorno, Los Lagos) is a Chilean athlete specializing in the hammer throw. Her older brother, Patricio Palma, was also a hammer thrower.

Career
Her personal best throw of 66.63 metres achieved in 2011 is the current national record.

Competition record

References

External links
IAAF profile
Australian Open Track & Field Championships

1982 births
Living people
Chilean female hammer throwers
People from Osorno, Chile
Athletes (track and field) at the 2003 Pan American Games
Athletes (track and field) at the 2007 Pan American Games
Pan American Games competitors for Chile
Athletes (track and field) at the 2011 Pan American Games
21st-century Chilean women
20th-century Chilean women